Fun Factory may refer to:

 Fun Factory (band), a German Eurodance group
 "Fun Factory" (song), a 1991 single from The Damned
 Fun Factory (single album), a 2019 release by Fromis 9
 Fun Factory (company), a German manufacturer of erotic toys
 Fun Factory (TV series), a children's program on the early Sky Channel
 The Fun Factory (game show), a 1976 television program on NBC
 Fun Fun Factory, a shōjo manga by Yoshitomo Watanabe
 Play-Doh Fun Factory an accessory for Play-Doh that extrudes it in various shapes.
 Fun Factory Uganda, a Ugandan entertainment company

See also 
 Film studios run by Mack Sennett (including the Keystone Studios) were popularly known as his 'Fun Factory'.